One of 18 Angels is a 2000 album by Diary of Dreams.

Track listing

US Track listing 
The album was released by Metropolis Records in the United States and features a slightly different track list than the original version of the album.

Credits
 Guitar – Alistair Kane
 Lyrics By [All Words], Music By, Voice, Instruments, Arranged By, Recorded By, Mastered By – Adrian Hates
 Mastered By – Rainer Assmann
 Mastered By [Pre-mastering] – Christian Zimmerli
 Producer – Adrian Hates
 Recorded at "White Room" between August 1999 and December 1999.
 Mastered at White Room & A.M.P. Studio between November 1999 and December 1999.

References 

2000 albums
Diary of Dreams albums